Santu Antine ("Saint Constantine"), also known as Sa domo de su re ("The house of the king" in the Sardinian language) is a nuraghe (ancient megalithic edifice built by the Nuragic Civilization) in Torralba, one of the largest in Sardinia. It is located in the centre of the Cabu Abbas plain. The main structure was built around the 19-18th century BC, and the other parts of the nuraghe date back to the 17th–15th century BC. The main tower originally reached a height of 23–24 metres and contains three tholoi chambers on top of each other. The central tower with diameter of 15 metres is 17 metres high. Santu Antine is made of huge basalt blocks. It has three floors. The top floor is now gone. Some 27 meters long corridors built with the corbel arch technique can be observed inside of the Nuraghe, superimposed on two floors, the Nuraghe was provided with three wells.

Near the Nuraghe lie the remains of a Nuragic village.

The nuraghe has also been studied several times from an archaeoastronomic point of view, and these studies have shown how its structure is oriented following the solstices. These claims were supported, among others, by the archaeologist Ercole Contu and archaeostronomists Mauro Peppino Zedda, Juan Antonio Belmonte and Michael Hoskin. In particular, Hoskin, science historian and emeritus professor at Churchill College in Cambridge, called Santu Antine "the most sophisticated dry stone monument on earth's surface".

See also
 Nuragic civilization

Bibliography 
 Il Nuraghe Santu Antine, Ercole Contu, 1988. (PDF available at Sardegna Digital Library.)

References

External links 

 
 Tharros.info: Site Description Nuraghe Santu Antine

Monuments and memorials in Italy
Buildings and structures in Sardinia
Megalithic monuments in Italy
Tourist attractions in Sardinia
Archaeological sites in Sardinia
Nuraghe